The Metropolis of Wallachia and Dobruja, headquartered in Bucharest, Romania, is a metropolis of the Romanian Orthodox Church.

History
The Metropolis of Ungro-Wallachia was created, in 1359, by Callistus I, the Ecumenical Patriarch of Constantinople as the most senior church office of the Patriarchate of Constantinople, covering the territory of Wallachia.

In 1872, the Metropolis of Ungro-Wallachia united with the Metropolis of Moldavia to form the Romanian Orthodox Church. The Metropolis of Ungro-Wallachia, who received the title of Primate Metropolitan in 1865, became the head of the General Synod of the Romanian Orthodox Church. In 1990, it became Metropolis of Muntenia and Dobruja.

List of Metropolitans
 Maxim (1508–1512)
 Macarie II (1512–1521)
 Ilarion II (1521–1523)
 vacancy (1523–1525)
 Teodor II (1525–1533)
 Mitrofan I (1533–1535)
 Varlaam I (1535–1544)
 Anania (1544–1558)
 Efrem (1558–1566)
 Danil I (1566)
 vacancy (1566–1568)
 Eftimie I (1568–1576)
 Serafim (1576–1586)
 Mihail I (1586–1590)
 Nichifore (1590)
 Mihail II (1590–1594)
 Eftimie II (1594–1602)
 Luca (1602–1629)
 Grigore I (1629–1636)
 Teofil (1636–1648)
 Stefan (1648–1653)
 Ignaţiu I (1653–1662)
 Stefan I (1662–1668), restored
 Teodosie (1668–1672)
 Dionisie (1672)
 Varlaam II (1672–1679)
 Teodosie (1679–1708), restored
 Antim (1708–1716)
 Mitrofan II (1716–1719)
 Danil II (1719–1731)
 Ştefan II (1731–1738)
 Neofit I (1738–1753)
 Filaret I (1753–1760)
 Grigorie II (1760–1787)
 Cosma (1787–1792)
 Filaret II (1792–1793)
 Dositei (1793–1810)
 Ignaţiu II (1810–1812)
 Nectarie (1812–1819)
 vacancy (1819–1821)
 Dionisie II (1821–1823)
 Grigorie III (1823–1834)
 vacancy (1834–1840)
 Neofit II (1840–1849)

As Metropolitans of All Romania
 Nifon (1850–1875)
 Calinic (1875–1886)
 Iosif (1886–1893)
 Ghenadie (1893–1896)
 Iosif (1896–1909), restored
 Atanasie (1909–1911)
 Conon (1912–1919)
 Miron (1919–1925)

As Patriarchs of All Romania
 Miron (1925–1939)
 Nicodim (1939–1948)
 Iustinian (1948–1977)
 Iustin (1977–1986)
 Teoctist (1986–2007)
 Daniel (since 2007)

See also
 History of Christianity in Romania

References

External links
 Official website
 Maksym Mayorov. Metropolitan of Kiev and other Eastern Orthodox Churches before 1686 (maps) (Київська митрополія та інші православні церкви перед 1686 роком (карти)). Likbez. 16 December 2018

 
1359 establishments in Europe